The 2012 Norwegian Football Cup will the 107th season of the Norwegian annual knockout football tournament. It began with qualification matches in April 2012. The first round was played on 1 May 2012 and the tournament ended with the final on 25 November 2012. Aalesund was the defending champions, having beaten Brann 2–1 in last season's final, but was eliminated by Sandefjord in the Fourth Round.

The victory earned Hødd a place in the second qualifying round of the 2013–14 UEFA Europa League.

Calendar
Below are the dates for each round as given by the official schedule:

First round
The 49 winners from the Second Qualifying Round joined with 79 clubs from the Premier League, First Division and Second Division in this round of the competition.

This round saw the top-flight teams Sandnes Ulf and Sogndal eliminated. This was the first time since 1993, when Jevnaker eliminated Lyn, that a team from the top division is eliminated in the first round. 11,273 spectators saw Vålerenga win 2-1 against Lyn, which is a new all-time high attendance for the first round. The old record was 5,625, from 1945. This was also the first time since 1967 that the two teams from Oslo met in the Norwegian Cup.

|colspan="3" style="background-color:#97DEFF"|1 May 2011

|-
|colspan="3" style="background-color:#97DEFF"|2 May 2011

|-
|colspan="3" style="background-color:#97DEFF"|3 May 2011

|}

Second round
The Second Round took place on the week commencing 7 May 2012. The 64 winners from the First Round competed in this stage of the competition. The setup for this round was announced on 3 May 2012.

|colspan="3" style="background-color:#97DEFF"|9 May 2012

|-
|colspan="3" style="background-color:#97DEFF"|10 May 2012

|}

Third round
The Third Round was played on the week commencing 18 June 2012.

|colspan="3" style="background-color:#97DEFF"|20 June 2012

|}

Fourth round
The Fourth Round took place from 27 June to 5 July 2012.

Quarter-finals
The draw for the Quarter-finals took place on 10 July 2012, and the matches were played on 18 and 19 August 2012.

Semi-finals
The draw for the semi-finals took place on 20 August, with the second-tier side Hødd being drawn at home against Brann, while Molde met Tromsø at Alfheim Stadion. The matches took place on the week commencing 24 September 2012.

Final 

The 2012 Norwegian Football Cup Final was played between Tromsø and Hødd at Ullevaal Stadion in Oslo on 25 November 2012.

Statistics

Top goalscorers

Source:

References

 
Norwegian Football Cup seasons
Cup
Norway